Irene Molloy is an American actress, singer, and songwriter. She is best known for her roles on television series Andy Richter Controls the Universe and Grosse Pointe. She has also appeared in Broadway and Off-Broadway musicals, television series and movies.

Career

Molloy's film debut was in Story of a Bad Boy. Between 2000 and 2004, she starred in two comedy series. The first was as Hunter Fallow/Becky Johnson in Grosse Pointe which ran between 2000 and 2001. After the show ended, she gained a role as main character Wendy McKay in the TV series Andy Richter Controls the Universe, which aired for two seasons from 2002 to 2004.

Theatre

References

External links
Irene Molloy Official
 

Living people
American women singers
American television actresses
Year of birth missing (living people)
21st-century American women